M. A. Reza is a Jatiya Party (Ershad) politician and the former Member of Parliament of Shariatpur-3.

Early life 
Reza was born on 17 February 1947. He graduated from the University of Dhaka with a Masters in political science.

Career 
Reza started his political career with Chattra League. He joined Jatiya Party in 1984. He was elected to parliament from Shariatpur-3 as a Jatiya Party candidate in 1988.

Death 
Reza died on 9 December 2001.

References 

Jatiya Party politicians
1947 births
2001 deaths
4th Jatiya Sangsad members
University of Dhaka alumni